Nereta Parish is an administrative unit of Aizkraukle Municipality in the Selonia region of Latvia. From 2009 to 2021 it was a part of Nereta Municipality.

Towns, villages and settlements of Nereta Parish 
Nereta
Neretaslauki
Svajāni

Parishes of Latvia
Aizkraukle Municipality
Selonia